Chalepus sanguinicollis is a species of leaf beetle in the family Chrysomelidae. It is found in the Caribbean Sea, North America, and South America.

References

Further reading

External links

 

Cassidinae
Articles created by Qbugbot
Beetles described in 1771
Taxa named by Carl Linnaeus